Nimravus is an extinct genus of "false" saber-toothed cat in the family Nimravidae, that was endemic to North America during the Oligocene epoch 33.3—26.3 mya, existing for approximately . Not closely related to true saber-toothed cats, they evolved a similar form through parallel evolution. Fossils have been uncovered in the western U.S. from Oregon to southern California and Nebraska.

Description
With its sleek body, it may have resembled the modern caracal, although it had a longer back and more dog-like feet with partially retractile claws. It probably hunted birds and small mammals, ambushing them like modern cats, rather than chasing them down. Nimravus competed with other false sabre-tooths such as Hoplophoneus.

Pathology 
A Nimravus skull, found in North America, had been pierced in the forehead region, the hole exactly matching the dimensions of the sabre-like canine of Eusmilus. This particular individual of Nimravus apparently survived this encounter, as the wound showed signs of healing. Another Nimravus fossil from Nebraska was described in 1959 by paleontologist Loren Toohey, and comprises a Nimravus skull with saber-teeth embedded into the humerus of another Nimravus, indicating a fatal incidence of intra-specific combat.

References

External links 

Nimravidae
Oligocene feliforms
Chattian genus extinctions
Rupelian genus first appearances
Oligocene mammals of Europe
Paleogene France
Fossils of France
Quercy Phosphorites Formation
Oligocene mammals of North America
Fossil taxa described in 1879
Prehistoric carnivoran genera
Taxa named by Edward Drinker Cope